Following is a list of all Article III United States federal judges appointed by President Andrew Jackson during his term of office. In total Jackson appointed 23 Article III federal judges: 5 Justices to the Supreme Court of the United States and 18 judges to the United States district courts.

John Catron was nominated to the United States Supreme Court by President Jackson on the final day of his presidency, March 3, 1837. The United States Senate confirmed the nomination on March 8, 1837 and President Martin Van Buren issued his commission, and thus appointed him, the same day. Jackson nominated William Smith to the United States Supreme Court on his final day in office. The Senate confirmed Smith on March 8, 1837, but he declined the appointment.

United States Supreme Court justices

District courts

Notes

Renominations

References
General

 

Specific

Sources
 Federal Judicial Center

Jackson